European Film Award for Best Non-European Film also known as Prix Screen International:

Winners and nominees
1996 – Dead Man
1997 – Hana-bi
1998 – The Truman Show
1999 – The Straight Story
2000 – In the Mood for Love
2001 – Moulin Rouge!
2002 – Chronicle of Love and Pain
2003 – The Barbarian Invasions
2004 – 2046
2005 – Good Night, and Good Luck.

External links
European Film Academy archive

Non-European